Kelvinbridge was a railway station for the Kelvinbridge area in the West End of Glasgow, close to Kelvinbridge subway station on the Glasgow Subway.

Chronology
This station was opened on 10 August 1896.

It served as the mainline station for taking visitors to the 1901 Glasgow International Exhibition.

It was closed to passengers on 4 August 1952 and to freight on 6 July 1964, with the line being closed on 5 October 1964.

The building was destroyed by fire in August 1968.

Description of the site
The line entered the station site in the south east corner passing under Gibson Street next to the River Kelvin and ran alongside the east side of the river until reaching the north west corner when it crossed the river prior to passing under Caledonian Crescent where the station building was located. The goods yard was located to the east of the line, and was converted to a park and ride car park as part of the Glasgow Subway modernisation in 1976–1979.

The station building was designed by well known Glasgow architect James Miller who designed many other Caledonian Railway stations, including Botanic Gardens which was the next stop on the line. It was in a style similar to other stations designed by Miller at the time. It was destroyed by a fire started by children while abandoned in August 1968. The outer walls with some decorative stonework as well as the base of an entrance vestibule with the pattern and fragments of the black and white checked floor tiles remain. Above the station site and mouth of the tunnel is Caledonian Mansions which was built by the Caledonian Railway company on land it purchased for tunnel construction. The company's monogram is still visible on the east side of the mansions on Caledonian Crescent, just uphill from the station site.

At the north west corner of the site the formation of the line from the station towards Botanic Gardens passes under Otago Street where the station buildings were located, before entering the tunnel under Great Western Road.

It was through the tunnel (at the south of the site) to Stobcross that the River Kelvin flowed when it burst its banks at the site of the station goods yard in December 1994. As part of the flood defence measures put in place, a bank was put in place in front of the tunnel mouth.

Gallery

References

Notes

Sources
 
 
 Urquhart, Gordon R. (2000). 'Along Great Western Road: An Illustrated History of Glasgow's West End'. Stenlake Publishing. .

Disused railway stations in Glasgow
Former Caledonian Railway stations
Railway stations in Great Britain opened in 1896
Railway stations in Great Britain closed in 1917
Railway stations in Great Britain opened in 1919
Railway stations in Great Britain closed in 1952
Train and rapid transit fires
Building and structure fires in Scotland
1968 disasters in the United Kingdom
James Miller railway stations
1968 fires in the United Kingdom
Disasters in Glasgow
Hillhead